Simone Smith is a Canadian film and television editor, who won the Canadian Screen Award for Best Editing at the 7th Canadian Screen Awards in 2019 for her work on the film Firecrackers.

She was previously nominated in the same category at the 6th Canadian Screen Awards in 2018 for Never Steady, Never Still.

References

External links

Canadian film editors
Best Editing Genie and Canadian Screen Award winners
Living people
Canadian women film editors
Year of birth missing (living people)